Coenaculum weerdtae is a species of sea snail, a marine gastropod mollusc in the family Cimidae. The species is one of four known species to exist within the genus Coenaculum, the other three being Coenaculum minutulum, Coenaculum secundum and Coenaculum tertium.

Description 
The maximum recorded shell length is 2.1 mm.

Habitat 
Minimum recorded depth is 30 m. Maximum recorded depth is 30 m.

References

External links

Cimidae
Gastropods described in 1992